Bannatyne is a populated place in the parish of Christ Church, Barbados.

See also
 List of cities, towns and villages in Barbados

References

Christ Church, Barbados
Populated places in Barbados